Tomislav Tomović (born 13 May 1983) is a Serbian professional basketball coach and former player who is an assistant coach for Mega Basket of the ABA League.

Professional career 
A point guard, Tomović played for Crvena zvezda, Yambolgaz 92, Banjalučka pivovara, Bosna, Panionios, Mega Aqua Monta, and Zrinjski.

National team career 
In July 1999, Tomović was a member of the Yugoslavia U16 national team that won the gold medal at the European Championship for Cadets in Slovenia. Over eight tournament games, he averaged 2.1 points, 1.2 rebounds, and 0.6 assists per game.

Coaching career 
In August 2012, Tomović was hired as an assistant coach for OKK Beograd under Srđan Jeković.

In August 2014, Tomović was an assistant coach for the Serbia national under-18 team under Aleksandar Bućan that won the silver medal at the FIBA Europe Under-18 Championship in Konya, Turkey.

In 2015, Tomović was hired as an assistant coach for the Shandong Golden Stars under Aleksandar Kesar. Later, he was an assistant coach for Guangxi Weizhuang, Sichuan Blue Whales, Qingdao Eagles, and Shandong Heroes.

On 20 June 2022, Mega Basket hired Tomović as their new assistant coach to head coach Marko Barać.

National teams 
In July 2019, Tomović was an assistant coach for the Serbia under-19 team under Aleksandar Bućan at the FIBA Under-19 Basketball World Cup in Heraklion, Greece. In July 2022, Tomović was an assistant coach for the Serbia national under-17 team under Dragoljub Avramović that finished the fifth at the 2022 FIBA Under-17 Basketball World Cup in Spain.

Career achievements 
As player
 Bosnia and Herzegovina League champion: 3 (with Bosna: 2004–05, 2005–06, 2007–08)
 Cup of Bosnia and Herzegovina winner: 1 (with Bosna: 2004–05)

References

External links
 Tomislav Tomovic at eurobasket.com
 Tomislav Tomovic at proballers.com
 Tomislav Tomovic at aba-liga.com
 Tomislav Tomovic at realgm.com

1983 births
Living people
Basketball League of Serbia players
Basketball players from Belgrade
BC Yambol players
KK Borac Banja Luka players
KK Bosna Royal players
KK Crvena zvezda players
KK Mega Basket players
Panionios B.C. players
Point guards
Serbian men's basketball coaches
Serbian men's basketball players
Serbian expatriate basketball people in Bosnia and Herzegovina
Serbian expatriate basketball people in Bulgaria
Serbian expatriate basketball people in China
Serbian expatriate basketball people in Greece